The former I.O.O.F. Hall, located at 613-615 Iowa Avenue in the original commercial block of Dunlap, Harrison County, Iowa, is an historic two-story pedimented red-brick building built for local members of the Independent Order of Odd Fellows. Also known as the Odd Fellows Hall, it was used by Golden Rule Lodge No. 178, IOOF founded  in 1869 and Guiding Star Encampment No. 68, IOOF, a higher body founded in 1874. Like many American lodge halls of the late 19th and early 20th centuries, it had business and commercial space on the ground floor while the lodge hall was upstairs. In 2009 it was renovated for its owner Brad Gross, CPA, who now uses it for his professional office. On June 23, 2011, it was added to the National Register of Historic Places.

See also
 List of Registered Historic Places in Iowa
 Odd Fellows Hall

References

Clubhouses on the National Register of Historic Places in Iowa
Buildings and structures in Harrison County, Iowa
Odd Fellows buildings in Iowa
National Register of Historic Places in Harrison County, Iowa